Indomie is a brand of instant noodle produced by the Indonesian company Indofood. Indofood itself is the largest instant noodle producer in the world with 16 factories. Over 15 billion packets of Indomie are produced annually. Indomie is also exported to more than 90 countries around the world. Indofood's key export markets are Australia, New Zealand, Malaysia, India, Iraq, Papua New Guinea, Hong Kong, East Timor, Jordan, Saudi Arabia, Ghana, China, Canada, United States, United Kingdom, France, Brazil, Spain, Germany, Nigeria, Russia, South Africa, Mexico,  Ukraine, Taiwan, Egypt, Lebanon, Japan, and some remaining countries in Middle East, Europe, Africa, North America, Latin America, and Asia. Indomie has been produced mainly in Indonesia since it was first introduced in 1972, Indomie has also been produced in Nigeria since 1995. Indomie has also been increasingly popular in Nigeria and other African countries.

Background

Etymology 
Indomie's name is derived from "indo" for "Indonesia" and "mie", the Indonesian word for "noodles".

History 
Instant noodles were introduced into the Indonesian market in 1969. Indofood is one of Indonesia's largest pre-packaged food companies which was founded in 1982 by Sudono Salim (1916–2012), an Indonesian tycoon who also owned Bogasari Flour Mills.

The Indomie instant noodle brand was first produced in 1972 by PT Sanmaru Food Manufacturing Co. Ltd. with the Indomie Kuah Rasa Kaldu Ayam (chicken broth) flavour and followed by the Indomie Kuah Rasa Kari Ayam (chicken curry) flavour in 1980. In 1982, PT Sanmaru Food launched its first dry variant (served without soup), Indomie Mi Goreng (fried noodle), which quickly became popular in the Indonesian market.

In 1984, PT Sanmaru Food was acquired by PT Sarimi Asli Jaya, which was owned by Bogasari flour mills, before they merged into PT Indofood Sukses Makmur Tbk in 1994. Indomie accounted for around 70 per cent of the instant noodle market in Indonesia in 2010.

Indomie won several awards including the Lausanne Index Prize (L.I.P.), Indonesia Best Brand Award (IBBA), the Most Effective Ad award, the Indonesia Consumer Satisfaction Award (ICSA), and the Indonesia Best Packaging Award.

Varieties 

Indomie noodles come in a variety of brands and flavours. The brand is divided into five product categories: Indomie goreng (fried noodle served without soup), Indomie kuah (with soup), Kuliner Indonesia (Indonesian cuisine), Mi Keriting (premium curly noodle), and Hype Abis (unique spicy flavours). Many of the Indomie flavours were created by Nunuk Nuraini, an employee in the instant noodle division of Indofood.

Indomie noodle soup flavours include Rasa Ayam Bawang (onion chicken flavour), Rasa Ayam Spesial (special chicken flavour), Rasa Kaldu Ayam (chicken broth flavour), Rasa Kaldu Udang (shrimp flavour), Rasa Kari Ayam (chicken curry flavour, also available with fried onion in Java and Bali islands of Indonesia), Rasa Soto Mie (Soto mie or vegetable flavour), and Rasa Soto Spesial (Special Soto flavour with Koya powder). There is also Beef and Vegetables (vegetarian) noodle soup flavours in some export markets.

Mi Goreng 

The Mi Goreng (stir fry) line of instant noodles by Indomie, based on the Indonesian dish mie goreng (fried noodle), entered the market in 1983 and is distributed in North America, Europe, Africa, Australasia, and various regions in Asia. The brand flavours are sold in varying weight packets of around 85 grams (3 oz) and contain two sachets of flavourings. The first sachet has three segments and carries the liquid condiments: sweet soy sauce, chili sauce, and seasoning oil with fried onion flakes. The other sachet has two segments for dry seasoning powder and flake of fried shallot. In some regions, Mi Goreng is also available in Jumbo (large) packs, a larger variant with a net weight of 127–129 grams (4.48-4.55 oz).

The line is available in Mi Goreng (original fried noodle, also available with fried onion and chili sauce in Java and Bali islands of Indonesia, as well in Australia, Canada, and the United States), Mi Goreng Pedas (hot and spicy fried noodle with fried onion), Mi Goreng Rasa Ayam Panggang (barbeque chicken flavour fried noodle, available with fried onion in export markets), and Mi Goreng Rasa Sate (Satay flavour fried noodle with fried onion, currently available in Taiwan and Australia). The first three flavours are also available in cup noodle variant in export markets. There is also Mi Goreng Rasa Cabe Ijo or Mi Goreng Perisa Cili Hijau (green chili flavour fried noodle, only available in Indonesia, Malaysia and Saudi Arabia), Mi Goreng Rasa Iga Penyet (spicy beef ribs flavour fried noodle, available in Indonesia, Vietnam and export markets), Mi Goreng Rasa Soto (Soto flavour fried noodle, currently available in Malaysia), Mi Goreng Rasa Sambal Matah (Balinese Sambal flavour fried noodle), Mi Goreng Rasa Sambal Rica-Rica (Minahasan Sambal flavour fried noodle), and Mi Goreng Kriuuk.. Pedas (fried noodle with spicy crunchy fried onion). The latter three are only available in Indonesia. The Jumbo variant is only available in Mi Goreng (original fried noodle with fried onion), and Mi Goreng Rasa Ayam Panggang (barbeque chicken flavour fried noodle with dried vegetable garnish).

Other variants  

Indomie Kuliner Indonesia refers to Indonesian traditional cuisine variants, such as Mie Aceh (Acehnese fried noodle with fried onion, also available in Malaysia), Mi Goreng Rasa Ayam Pop (Pop chicken flavour fried noodle), Mi Goreng Rasa Cakalang (skipjack tuna flavour fried noodle), Mi Goreng Rasa Rendang (spicy beef flavour fried noodle, also available in Vietnam and export markets), Rasa Coto Makassar (Makassarese Soto flavour), Rasa Empal Gentong (Cirebonese clay pot beef soup flavour), Rasa Mie Celor (spicy coconut shrimp noodle soup flavour), Rasa Mie kocok Bandung (Bandung beef noodle soup flavour), Rasa Soto Banjar (Banjar Soto flavour), Rasa Soto Banjar Limau Kuit (Banjar Soto with kaffir lime flavour), Rasa Soto Lamongan (Lamongan Soto flavour), Rasa Soto Medan (Medanese Soto flavour), and Rasa Soto Padang (Padang Soto flavour).

Mi Keriting (curly noodle) is the premium variant with additional toppings. It is available in Rasa Ayam Panggang (grilled chicken flavour with separate soup), Goreng Spesial (special fried curly noodle), and Salted Egg flavour fried curly noodle. There is also Real Meat fried curly noodle variants with real chicken meat, available in Mushroom Chicken and Pepper Chicken flavours.

The Hype Abis series are the variants with unique spicy flavours that were introduced in 2019, and are only available in Indonesia. Variants include Mi Goreng Rasa Ayam Geprek (spicy crushed fried chicken flavour fried noodle, introduced in early 2019), Rasa Seblak Hot Jeletot (Sundanese spicy soup flavour, introduced in early 2020), Mieghetti Rasa Bolognese (Bolognese sauce flavour spaghetti-style noodle, introduced in early 2021), and Mi Goreng Rasa Kebab Rendang (spicy beef kebab flavour fried noodles, introduced in September 2022). There was also Mi Goreng Chitato Rasa Sapi Panggang (fried noodle with Chitato beef barbeque flavour), a limited edition flavour in collaboration with Chitato potato chips brand to celebrate Chitato's 30th anniversary, available from May 2019.

Nigeria 
In Nigeria, Indomie is available in Chicken, Onion Chicken, Chicken Pepper Soup, and Oriental Fried Noodles flavours. There is also Indomie Relish variant in Chicken Delight and Seafood Delight flavours.

Pop Mie 
Pop Mie is an instant cup noodle brand which is a sub-brand of Indomie, first introduced in Indonesia in 1991. The soup variant is available in Rasa Ayam (chicken flavour), Rasa Ayam Bawang (onion chicken flavour) Rasa Baso (meatball flavour), Rasa Kari Ayam (chicken curry flavour), and Rasa Soto Ayam (chicken soto flavour). The Pop Mie Goreng variant is available in Mi Goreng Spesial (special fried noodle) and Mi Goreng Pedas (hot and spicy fried noodle). There is also spicy variant called Pedes Dower (spicy chicken flavour noodle soup) and Pedes Gledek (spicy chicken flavour fried noodle), introduced in 2018 and 2019, respectively, and also a soup variant with dried rice called Pake Nasi, which is only available in Rasa Soto Ayam (chicken soto flavour), introduced in 2020.

Timeline 
 1972: Indomie were first introduced to Market in Indonesia, produced by PT Sanmaru Foods Manufacturing Co. Ltd.
 1982: Indomie introduces a new Indomie flavor variant "Mi Goreng" based on the Indonesian dish "Mie goreng", and Indomie has been distributed to several countries through exports.
 1988: Indomie was introduced in Nigeria through exports from Indonesia.
 1995: Indomie opened its first production factory in Nigeria under Dufil Prima Foods – the first instant noodles manufacturing plant of its kind in Nigeria and the largest in Africa.
 2005: Indomie broke the Guinness Book of World Records category for "The Largest Packet of Instant Noodles" by creating a packet that was 3.4m x 2.355m x 0.47m, with a net weight of 664.938 kg, which is about 8,000 times the weight of a regular pack of instant noodles. It was made using the same ingredients as a regular pack of instant noodles and was certified fit for human consumption.
 13 December 2009: Roger Ebert put Indomie on his "Twelve Gifts of Christmas".
 3 January 2010: Indomie released its new design in Indonesia. This design started being used in export markets in mid-2010s, replacing the 2005–2009 design, with the Philippines and Hong Kong being the last countries to adopt this design in February and June 2022, respectively, replacing the 2001–2004 design.
 7 October 2010: in Taipei, the Taipei County Public Health Bureau announced that cosmetic preservatives were found in Indomie instant noodle products and ordered all vendors to withdraw the product from the market. On 11 October, Indofood released an official statement: "The Company believes that the recent reports in the Taiwanese media arose concerning instant noodle products manufactured by ICBP that were not intended for the Taiwanese market." The authorities there have since allowed the instant noodle products to re-enter Taiwan market on 6 May 2011.
 11 January 2016: Australian singer-songwriter Courtney Barnett released a song, "Three packs a day" about Mi goreng on a compilation on her record label Milk!
 6 November 2016: Indomie was a sponsor of Premier League title holders Leicester City during a league match against West Bromwich Albion.

Controversies 
Taiwanese authorities on October 7, 2010 announced that the Indomie sold there contained two prohibited preservatives,  sodium benzoate and methyl p-hydroxybenzoate,  used to make cosmetics. Two leading supermarket chains in Hong Kong also temporarily stopped selling Indomie instant noodles.

Indomie's Hong Kong importer, Fok Hing (HK) Trading, stated that the instant noodles are still safe to consume and meet standards in Hong Kong and the World Health Organization, based on the results of quality tests which found no hazardous materials.

Indomie in Taiwan has been adjusted to regulations in Taiwan that do not use preservatives.

The Minister of Health of the Republic of Indonesia, Dr. Endang Rahayu Sedyaningsih in his response stated that Indomie was still safe to eat but still advised the public to reduce the consumption of instant noodles. As a result of this issue, the share price of Indofood CBP as the producer of Indomie dropped.

See also 

List of instant noodle brands

References

External links 

Indomie – Product website
Indofood – Mi Goreng Manufacturer

Indonesian brands
Indonesian noodles
Instant noodle brands
Products introduced in 1972